Robert L. Day (January 2, 1920 – January 25, 1999) was an American politician who served a single term as mayor of Boise, Idaho, from 1959 to 1961.

References

Mayors of Boise, Idaho
1920 births
1999 deaths
20th-century American politicians